Ficus aguaraguensis is a species of plant in the family Moraceae. It is endemic to Bolivia.  It is threatened by habitat loss.

References

Sources

aguaraguensis
Endemic flora of Bolivia
Plants described in 1981
Vulnerable flora of South America
Taxonomy articles created by Polbot